Sinéad Louise Farrell is a British-American space scientist who is Professor of Geographic Sciences at the University of Maryland, College Park. Her research considers remote sensing and climate monitoring. She was science lead for the ICESat-2 Mission, which used laser altimetery to make height maps of Earth.

Early life and education 
Farrell was an undergraduate student in geological science at University College London. She remained at UCL for doctoral research, where she studied space and climate physics. Her research considered satellite laser altimetery, using data collected from ICESat to understand sea-ice covered regions of the Arctic. Farrell worked as a postdoctoral researcher at UCL for one year, after which she was appointed at research fellow at the National Oceanic and Atmospheric Administration National Environmental Satellite, Data, and Information Service (NOAA NESDIS) laboratory. She was made a research associate at the University of Maryland, College Park in 2009.

Research and career 
In 2011, Farrell was appointed to the faculty in the Earth System Science Interdisciplinary Center at the University of Maryland, College Park. She moved to the Department of Geographical Sciences as an associate professor in 2019. Farrell studies polar oceans and sea ice. She has been involved with several NASA missions, and demonstrated the ability of satellite data to better understand ice-covered water.

Farrell was part of Operation IceBridge, a NASA mission that revealed ridges on sea ice. She leads the NASA ICESat-2 Science Team, which was able to demonstrated that the Arctic lost one third of its volume from 2003, and that glacial lakes were forming under ice in the Antarctic. Using ICESat-2, Farrell was able to accurately measure the topography of sea ice, which she proposed could be used to map sea ice models. In 2022, anomalously warm weather caused one of the lowest levels of sea ice in modern record.

Selected publications

Personal life 
Alongside her research, Farrell campaigns to improve access to science. In 2021, when no women were nominated to be fellows in the cryosphere section of the American Geophysical Union, she decided not to elect anyone at all.

References 

Living people
Space scientists
Alumni of University College London
British women scientists
University of Maryland, College Park faculty
Year of birth missing (living people)